The Eclipse Stakes was an American Thorougbred race for two-year-old horses of either sex. Inaugurated August 24, 1889 at New York's Morris Park Racecourse with a then substantial purse of $28,000, from inception through 1894 the race was known as the Great Eclipse Stakes. Initially run at a distance of 6 furlongs, in 1897 the race was reduced to 5 1/2 furlongs. The Morris Park facility did not reopen after its 1904 racing season and in 1905 the event was taken up by the owners of the new Belmont Park racing facility in Elmont, New York where it would be run annually through 1907.

Historical race notes
The end of the Eclipse Stakes came as a result of the 1908 passage of the Hart–Agnew anti-betting legislation by the New York Legislature under Republican Governor Charles Evans Hughes. Without income from wagering, racetracks throughout New York began cutting costs to survive and the Eclipse was one of its casualties. 

The first edition of the Eclipse in 1889 was won by El Rio Rey, a colt bred in California by Theodore Winters for whom the city of Winters, California was named. 

Tammany's win in the 1891 Great Eclipse Stakes was a surprise to not only the fans but to trainer Matthew Byrnes who regarded the colt as the least likely to win of the three horses he had in the race. The following year, three-year-old Tammany would continue his winning ways and earn 1892 American Horse of the Year recognition.

Blue Girl, winner of the May 24, 1901 Eclipse Stakes for owner/trainer John Madden, would finish the year as a Co-Champion Two-Year-Old Filly with Endurance by Right. The next year Blue Girl would earn the same honor but this time by herself as the 1902 three-year-old champion.  

The final running of the Eclipse Stakes in 1907 was won by the great Hall of Fame inductee Colin. 

In 1920, the Empire City Race Track revived usage of the name Eclipse for a short-lived race for older horses at a much longer distance.

Records
Speed record:
 1:04.50 @ 5 1/2 furlongs: Frohman (1897)
 1:12.50 @ 6 furlongs: Tammany (1891)

Most wins by a jockey:
 2 - Fred Taral (1892, 1893)
 2 - Tod Sloan (1897, 1898)
 2 - Danny Maher (1899, 1900)

Most wins by a trainer:
 2 - John J. Hyland
 2 - Sam Hildreth (1898, 1899)

Most wins by an owner:
 2 - August Belmont Jr. (1896, 1902)

Winners

References

Flat horse races for two-year-old fillies
Discontinued horse races in New York (state)
Morris Park Racecourse
Recurring sporting events established in 1889
Recurring events disestablished in 1907